Wiegand sensors are magnetic sensors that do not need any external voltage or current, and make use of the Wiegand effect to generate a consistent pulse every time magnetic field polarity reverses. Wiegand sensors are made by wrapping a coil around a Vicalloy wire core, which, due to the hysteresis inherent in the Wiegand effect, induces a pulse in the coil each time the magnetic polarity of the Vicalloy wire core reverses. They can be used in a range of magnetic sensing applications and have the additional advantage that the energy of each pulse can be harvested.

Energy harvesting 
The consistency of the pulses produced by Wiegand sensors can also be used to provide energy for ultra-low power electronics to be operated using a single pulse. In addition, successive pulses can be stored to offset energy demand of low-power energy circuits. Alternatively, the pulses can be used to trigger, or ‘wake-up’, intermittently powered electronic circuits.

In certain applications, both functions of the pulses (magnetic sensing and energy harvesting) are exploited. The pulse energy is used to power ultra-low power circuitry or ICs which, in turn, use the timing of the pulses to perform calculation tasks (e.g. count event data).

Applications
Typical applications fall into three main categories; pulse generation applications, power transmission applications and combined sensing and energy harvesting applications.

Pulse generation
As a reliable source of consistently timed pulses, Wiegand sensors are used in industrial and commercial flow-metering applications (e.g. water and gas), and also to calculate rotation speed in tachometers (e.g. high-speed trains).

Power transmission
By placing the Wiegand sensor within an oscillating electro-magnetic fields (e.g. from a Helmholz coil), Wiegand sensors can be used to provide energy for low power applications in environments where high frequency transmission is challenging (e.g. transcutaneous power for medical devices).

Sensing and energy harvesting
Wiegand sensors are commonly used in ‘Batteryless’ rotary encoder technology for self-powered revolution counting. Harnessing both the timing of the pulses and the pulse energy, such rotary encoders provide reliable multiturn counting even in the absence of external power or batteries.

References 

Magnetic devices